Tanja Hess is a German bobsledder who competed in the late 1990s and the early 2000s. She won a bronze medal in the two-woman event at the 2001 FIBT World Championships in Calgary.

References
Bobsleigh two-woman world championship medalists since 2000

German female bobsledders
Living people
Year of birth missing (living people)
Place of birth missing (living people)
21st-century German women